Arnaldo Pagliarini "Arnie" Lerma (November 18, 1950 – March 16, 2018) was an American writer and activist, a former Scientologist, and a critic of the Church of Scientology who appeared in television, media and radio interviews. Lerma was the first person to post the court document known as the Fishman Affidavit, including the Xenu story, to the Internet via the Usenet newsgroup alt.religion.scientology.

Biography

Lerma was born in Washington, D.C. in 1950.

Time in Scientology

Lerma started in Scientology at the age of 16 at the urging of his mother who was the executive director of the  Founding Church of Scientology Washington D.C. (FCDC). He had been impressed by the Church's exaggerated account of L. Ron Hubbard's military career and scientific credentials. Lerma joined staff at FCDC and later in New York and was a course supervisor. Around 1970, he joined Scientology's Sea Org and served for seven years, being paid $10 per week and sometimes surviving on peanut butter.

During his time in Scientology, Lerma reach the level of OT III.

In 1976 he met Hubbard's daughter Suzette. Lerma became romantically involved and they planned to elope. Their relationship was discovered and Lerma was threatened with physical harm if he did not cancel the marriage plans.

Lerma quit Scientology soon afterward.

Internet activities 

Lerma said he didn't want to destroy Scientology, but he wanted a change of management. In the early internet, Arnie Lerma posted in the internet newsgroups "alt.religion.scientology" and "alt.clearing.technology", including posting public records from court cases involving the Church of Scientology. He scanned and posted documents he obtained, many of which were sent to him, including court documents known as the Fishman Affidavit or Fishman Declaration from the case Church of Scientology International v. Fishman and Geertz.

Scientology sues Lerma over copyrights

After Lerma posted the Fishman Affidavit in August 1995, his home was raided by federal marshals, led by lawyers from the Church of Scientology, alleging he was in possession of copyrighted documents. A lawsuit was filed against Lerma and his Internet service provider by the church's Religious Technology Center (RTC), claiming copyright infringement and trade secret misappropriation.

The Washington Post and two investigative reporters were added to the lawsuit, as an article written about the raid contained three brief quotes from Scientology "Advanced Technology" documents.

The Washington Post, et al., were released from the suit when United States District Judge Leonie Brinkema ruled in a memorandum on November 28, 1995

The 1995 memorandum opinion acknowledges what Scientology practices to this day: the "Fair Game" policy, a written directive by L. Ron Hubbard that encourages harassment of anyone who speaks out against the church. In conclusion, the court awarded to RTC damages in the statutory minimum of $2,500 ($500 for each of five instances of non-willful copyright violation) for posting online a substantial portion of a copyrighted work "without comment, criticism, or other significant changes that could constitute fair use". The court also ordered the return to Lerma of his computer and all items seized in the ex parte search which was supposed to be narrowly limited.

Lermanet

In the late 1990s, Arnie Lerma started a website called Lermanet, which concentrated on news about Scientology and on documenting lawsuits by Scientology. He was also noted for discovering an altered picture on a Scientology website on New Year's Eve in 1999, one that appeared to inflate the number of members attending a millennial event at the Los Angeles Sports Arena in California. He posted the pictures to his website identifying the alterations, with the most prominent feature being the "man with no head". The story appeared on national television and in the press.

Death and legacy

Arnie Lerma had been suffering with severe back pain for decades, despite two surgeries, and had become addicted to opiods and was increasingly paranoid. On March 16, 2018, Arnie Lerma shot his wife Ginger Sugerman twice in the face, and after she fled their home in Sylvania, Georgia he committed suicide by gunshot.

Sugerman survived but went through six surgeries and depressions. On March 28, 2019, in an attempt to reunite with her adult children who were still in the Church of Scientology but forbidden contact with her, she attempted to 'deliver a blow to the enemies of Scientology' by deleting Lermanet (lermanet.com) in the hopes that the Church would allow her to reconnect with her children. The deletion failed to achieve her goal of reuniting her family. Ginger Sugarman passed away in 2022.

In late 2019, the website reappeared as lermanet.org and his blog reappeared as arnielerma.blog.

Writings

The Internet is the Liberty Tree of the 90s
Copyrights and Why Scientology Hates Arnaldo Lerma
Scientology Gag Agreements - A Conspiracy for Silence
The art of deception, 1996

References

Further reading

External links

 lermanet.org (archived lermanet.com)
 arnielerma.blog
Church of Scientology protects secrets on the Internet CNN, Washington, August 26, 1995
Affidavit by Arnie Lerma dated September 6, 1995.
Brinkema, Leonie M. Civil Action No. 95-1107-A: Memorandum Opinion Alexandria: US District Court for the Eastern District of Virginia-Alexandria Division, November 28, 1995
alt.scientology.war by Wendy Grossman, Wired Magazine, December, 1995
Noted Scientology critic Arnie Lerma shoots and injures wife, then kills himself by Tony Ortega, The Underground Bunker, March 18, 2018

1950 births
2018 deaths
Critics of Scientology
American former Scientologists
People from Washington, D.C.
Scientology and the Internet
American whistleblowers
Suicides by firearm in Georgia (U.S. state)